Djuanda Kartawidjaja (EYD: Juanda Kartawijaya; 14 January 1911 – 7 November 1963), more commonly referred to mononymously as Djuanda, was an Indonesian politician and technocrat who held various positions during the presidency of Sukarno, most notably as prime minister of Indonesia and a cabinet minister in several cabinets.

Born into a noble ethnic Sundanese family, attended the Technische Hoogeschool te Bandoeng in Bandung. After graduating in 1933, he worked as a teacher and later an engineer. Following the proclamation of Indonesian Independence in 1945, he joined the newly-formed Republican government and served in several cabinets, mostly in economic portfolios. In 1957, Djuanda was appointed prime minister by Sukarno following the inability of the parties to form a cabinet. In 1959, Sukarno appointed himself prime minister but retained Djuanda as first minister with much the same duties as before. He died in 1963, contributing to the absence of an economic policy in the later years of Sukarno's Guided Democracy.

Since his death, various landmarks have been named in his honor, including Juanda International Airport in Surabaya, and Juanda railway station in Jakarta. He is also depicted in the recent 2016 edition of Rp 50,000 Indonesian rupiah banknotes.

Early life 

Djuanda Kartawidjaja was born on 14 January 1911, in Tasikmalaya, Preanger Regencies Residency, Dutch East Indies (now Tasikmalaya Regency, Indonesia). His family was of ethnic Sundanese noble descent. His father, Raden Kartawidjaja, was a young teacher, while his mother, Nyi Monat, was a housewife. He also has 3 brothers and 2 sisters. In his childhood, Djuanda Kartawidjaja went to elementary school at the Hogere Burger School (HBS). Then he transferred to the Europesche Lagere School (ELS). After that, he continued to the Technische Hoogeschool te Bandoeng (now the Bandung Institute of Technology), majoring in civil engineering. While a student, he was also active in non-political organizations such as the Paguyuban Pasundan and Muhammadiyah organizations. He graduated from the Bandung Institute of Technology in 1933.

Early career 

He became a teacher at a Muhammadiyah Islamic School in Batavia (now Jakarta), eventually becoming the principal of the school. In 1937, he became an engineer in the West Java Water Conservancy Bureau. In 1939, he became a senior advisor to the bureau. In addition, he also actively participated in the work of the Batavia Municipal Council. In 1942, the Japanese Empire invaded and occupied the Dutch East Indies. The Japanese changed Batavia to its current name Jakarta. In the same year, Juanda participated in the Jakarta City Council election but was not elected.

National revolution 

In 1943, the Japanese appointed Indonesian advisors (sanyo) to the administration and appointed nationalist leader Sukarno leader of a new Central Advisory Board (Chuo Sani-kai) in Jakarta. On 7 August, the day after the atomic bombing of Hiroshima, the Preparatory Committee for Indonesian Independence (Indonesian: Panitia Persiapan Kemerdekaan Indonesia) or PPKI was established. Sukarno was chairman, and Mohammad Hatta as vice chairman. On 19 August 1945, this body created 12 ministries for Indonesia's first cabinet, the Presidential cabinet.

Juanda was known as the "marathon minister." In the first 16 cabinets of Indonesia, he has been in the cabinet 12 times, mainly serving as Minister of Transport or Minister of Economy.  He joined Prime Minister Sutan Sjahrir ’s second cabinet (formed in March 1946) as a junior minister of the Ministry of Communications. In the third cabinet of Sjahrir, he joined the cabinet again and was promoted to minister of transportation. Apart from being the Minister of Transportation, he also held other strategic positions, including the Minister of Water, Prosperity, Finance and Defense.

He was also trusted to lead Dutch negotiations, one of which was negotiations at the Round Table Conference. During the conference, Djuanda was sent to be the Chair of the Economic and Finance Committee for the Indonesian Delegation. In the negotiations, the Netherlands officially recognized the independence of the Indonesian government.

Djuanda was also entrusted to lead the Japanese Railways Bureau. This was followed by the takeover of the Mining Bureau, Municipality, Residency and military objects in North Bandung Warehouse. After carrying out this task, he was appointed Head of the Railway Bureau for the Java and Madura regions.

Political career (1950-1963)

Prime Minister of Indonesia

Djuanda declaration 

The Djuanda Declaration which was initiated on 13 December 1957 by Djuanda. This declaration stated to the world that the Indonesian seas included the seas around, between and within the Indonesian archipelago into one unitary territory of the Republic of Indonesia or in the convention on the law of the sea. United Nations Convention on the Law of the Sea (UNCLOS), is known as an archipelagic state.

 The content of this Juanda Declaration states:
 That Indonesia declares as an archipelagic country that has its own style
 That since time immemorial, the archipelago has been a single entity
 The provisions of the 1939 Ordinance concerning the Ordinance, can divide the territorial integrity of Indonesia. The declaration contains a purpose:
 To realize the form of the territory of the Unitary Republic of Indonesia which is complete and round
 To determine the boundaries of the territory of the Republic of Indonesia, in accordance with the principles of the Archipelago State
 To regulate peaceful shipping traffic that further ensures the security and safety of the Unitary State of the Republic of Indonesia

The statement read by Djuanda became the legal basis for the drafting of the law used to replace the Territoriale Zee en Maritime Kringen Ordonantie in 1939.

Death (1963)
On the afternoon of 6 November 1963, Djuanda, accompanied by his wife and daughter, went to a hotel in Jakarta to participate in the opening ceremony. He fell suddenly at 11:25 p.m., and his pulse stopped 20 minutes later. His personal doctor rushed to the scene and gave him artificial respiration, but it was unsuccessful. On 7 November, the Indonesian government announced that Djuanda died of a heart attack.

Legacy
After his death, Djuanda was appointed a national figure, based on the Decree of the President of the Republic of Indonesia No. 224/1963. Juanda International Airport, located in Surabaya, is named after him, who suggested development for the airport. Juanda railway station in Jakarta got its name from the nearby road, which is also named after him. He is also depicted in the recent 2016 edition of Rp 50,000 Indonesian rupiah banknotes.

Honours
 : Honorary Grand Commander of the Order of the Defender of the Realm (SMN) (K) – Tun (1959)

References

Bibliography 
 Ricklefs (1982), A History of Modern Indonesia, Macmillan Southeast Asian reprint, 
 Simanjuntak, P.H.H (2003) Kabinet-Kabinet Republik Indonesia: Dari Awal Kemerdekaan Sampai Reformasi (Cabinets of the Republic of Indonesia: From the Start of Independence to the Reform Era), Penerbit Djambatan, Jakarta, 

1911 births
1963 deaths
Finance Ministers of Indonesia
People from Tasikmalaya
National Heroes of Indonesia
Sundanese people
Prime Ministers of Indonesia
1957 in Indonesia
Government ministers of Indonesia
Transport ministers of Indonesia
Honorary Grand Commanders of the Order of the Defender of the Realm